The 10th Macau International Movie Festival were held in Macau by the Macau Film and Television Media Association in December 2018.

Winners and nominees

References

Golden Lotus Awards
Macau
2018 in Macau
Gold